AcuaExpreso is a ferry service between Cataño and San Juan, Puerto Rico that consists of two routes:
 Cataño ⇆ Old San Juan on the Cataño Ferry docking at the AcuaExpreso Cataño Terminal in Cataño on the route's southwestern point and at the AcuaExpreso San Juan Terminal in Pier 2 of the San Juan Port in Old San Juan on the route's northeastern point, and
 Old San Juan ⇆ Hato Rey docking at AcuaExpreso San Juan Terminal in Pier 2 of the San Juan Port on the route's northwestern point and at the AcuaExpreso Hato Rey Terminal in Hato Rey on the route's southeastern point nearby the Coliseum of Puerto Rico with connection to the Tren Urbano metro system through Hato Rey station.

The ferries cross the San Juan Bay with its services running from mornings to evenings seven days a week as the weather and maritime conditions permit. Although the service is heavily used by tourists, its primary purpose is to serve as a transportation hub for those who live nearby Cataño but work in San Juan.

References

Puerto Rico Department of Transportation and Public Works
Ferries of Puerto Rico